Indus is an unincorporated community in Koochiching County, Minnesota, United States.

The community is located between International Falls and Baudette on State Highway 11 (MN 11).

Indus is located within Northwest Koochiching Unorganized Territory.

County Road 83, Town Road 297, and the Rainy River are all in the vicinity.

Nearby places include Birchdale, Loman, and Emo.  Indus is located 30 miles west of International Falls; and 38 miles east of Baudette.

In Indus, there is a school called Indus School which serves as a K-12 Outdoor Education Magnet School

History
A post office called Indus was established in 1902, and remained in operation until 1974. The community was named after the Indus River in Asia.

References

 Rand McNally Road Atlas – 2007 edition – Minnesota entry
 Official State of Minnesota Highway Map – 2011/2012 edition
 Mn/DOT map of Koochiching County – Sheet 3 – 2011 edition

Unincorporated communities in Minnesota
Unincorporated communities in Koochiching County, Minnesota